Gihahn Cloete (born 4 October 1992) is a South African cricketer. He made his international debut for the South Africa cricket team in October 2018.

Domestic career
Cloete was included in the Eastern Province cricket team squad for the 2015 Africa T20 Cup. In August 2018, he was named in Border's squad for the 2018 Africa T20 Cup.

In October 2018, Cloete was named in Tshwane Spartans' squad for the first edition of the Mzansi Super League T20 tournament. He was the leading run-scorer for the team in the tournament, with 330 runs in ten matches. In April 2021, he was named in Northerns' squad, ahead of the 2021–22 cricket season in South Africa.

International career
In September 2018, Cloete was named in South Africa's Twenty20 International (T20I) series against Zimbabwe. He made his T20I debut for South Africa against Zimbabwe on 9 October 2018.

References

External links
 

1992 births
Living people
South African cricketers
Warriors cricketers
South Africa Twenty20 International cricketers
Border cricketers
Eastern Province cricketers
Tshwane Spartans cricketers
Wicket-keepers